Doğan Özdenak (born 10 May 1954) is a Turkish former footballer who played as a goalkeeper.

Professional career
Özdenak made one appearance for Galatasaray in the Turkish Süper Lig, in a 3-2 win over Adanaspor on 8 May 1977. He was transferred to Galatasaray in 1977, as the third goalkeeper.

Personal life
Özdenak was born into a sporting family, as his brothers Yasin and Gökmen were also professional footballers.

References

External links
 

1954 births
Living people
Footballers from Istanbul
Turkish footballers
Association football goalkeepers
Galatasaray S.K. footballers
Süper Lig players
TFF First League players